Sirihuani or Sirijuani is a  mountain in the Urubamba mountain range in the Andes of Peru. It is located in the Cusco Region, Calca Province, in the districts of Calca and Lares. It is situated northwest of Sahuasiray and Canchacanchajasa, and northeast of Chicón.

References 

Mountains of Peru
Mountains of Cusco Region